Pape Mamadou "Mo" Faye (born 25 September 1993) is a Senegalese basketball player for AS Douanes and .

Professional career
In 2012, Faye started his career with Dbaloc Derkle in the Senegalese second division. In 2014, Faye transferred to M'Bour BC to play in the Nationale 1. After two seasons, he signed with US Ouakam.

In the 2019–20 season, he played in Algeria with Olympique Batna of the Algerian Basketball Championship. There, he averaged 29 points and 6 assists per game.

In September 2020, Faye signed with the defending Senegalese champions AS Douanes. He played with the team in the 2021 BAL season, where he averaged 14.8 points.

National team career
Faye was selected for the Senegal national basketball team, after coach Boniface N'Dong had watched him play in the 2021 BAL season. He was on the roster for AfroBasket 2021.

BAL career statistics

|-
| style="text-align:left;"|2021
| style="text-align:left;"|AS Douanes
| 4 || 0 || 24.1 || .488 || .471 || .692 || 4.0 || 5.5 || .8 || .0 || 14.8
|-
|- class="sortbottom"
| style="text-align:center;" colspan="2"|Career
| 4 || 0 || 24.1 || .488 || .471 || .692 || 4.0 || 5.5 || .8 || .0 || 14.8

References

External links
Mamadou Faye at Eurobasket
Mamadou Faye at RealGM

1993 births
Living people
Senegalese men's basketball players
Shooting guards
AS Douanes basketball players